Thavory Meas Bong  (ថាវរីមាសបង) is a Cambodian melodramatic film of the late 1960s directed by Uon Kon Thuok of Korng Chak Pheap Yun. The film stars Kong Som Oeurn, Saom Vansodany, Vichara Dany and So Hean.

Cast 
 Kong Som Oeurn
 Saom Vansodany
 Vichara Dany
 So Hean

Soundtrack

References 
 
 

Cambodian drama films
Khmer-language films